‘Bright Future’ was an innovation policy initiated by the National government in New Zealand in 1999. Originally called ‘Five Steps Ahead’, it was designed to identify the areas in which New Zealand innovation could be improved, including the tall poppy syndrome. It was overseen by the Ministry of Commerce, whose minister at the time was the Hon Max Bradford.

Amongst other initiatives, the Bright Future programme introduced a group of scholarships for talented students at graduate and post-graduate level.

The policy was dropped by the Fifth Labour Government.

See also
Politics of New Zealand

References

Further reading

Political history of New Zealand
New Zealand National Party
1999 in New Zealand
Political terminology in New Zealand